Dead City Radio is a musical album by Beat Generation author William S. Burroughs, which was released by Island Records in 1990. It was dedicated to Keith Haring.

The CD is a collection of readings by Burroughs set to a broad range of musical compositions. It was produced by Hal Willner and Nelson Lyon, with musical accompaniment from John Cale, Donald Fagen, Lenny Pickett, Chris Stein, and alternative rock band Sonic Youth, among others. Although not Burroughs' first album—he released his first spoken word album Call Me Burroughs in the 1960s and was a fixture on the Giorno Poetry Systems collections of the 1970s and 1980s—this was the first release to receive wide public attention.

Most of the recordings of Burroughs readings were made at his home in Lawrence, Kansas between December 12 and 15 1988, with further recordings taking place on June 24, 1989. The music was added at a later date. During these sessions Burroughs was captured singing the German standard "Ich bin von Kopf bis Fuß auf Liebe eingestellt" (Falling in Love Again), a song associated with Marlene Dietrich. This recording was included as a bonus track and is the only commercially available track as of 2012 to depict the author actually singing.

The material performed by Burroughs on the album included excerpts from some of his famous works such as Naked Lunch, as well as a couple of items from his 1989 short story collection Tornado Alley. The track "Kill the Badger!" is an excerpt from Burroughs' novella The Cat Inside. A music video was created Burroughs' reading of "A Thanksgiving Prayer" (a poem from Tornado Alley); the reading (like the book from which it came) is dedicated to John Dillinger. Burroughs prefaces his reading of the short story "Where He Was Going" with a brief discussion of its inspiration and origins. The brief narrative "Brion Gysin's All-Purpose Bedtime Story" is taken from Ghost of Chance, a novella Burroughs would publish in 1991.

Several tracks include Burroughs discussing elements of Christianity and The Bible in a conversational style, and one track has Burroughs reciting the Sermon on the Mount while adding editorial comment.

The track "Ah Pook the Destroyer" was later used as the soundtrack for the acclaimed animated short film Ah Pook Is Here. Burroughs' song "Falling in Love Again" plays over the closing credits of the film.

Track listing
 "William's Welcome (What Are You Here For?)"  (featuring Sonic Youth, music by Lenny Pickett)
 "A Thanksgiving Prayer" (music by Frank Denning)
 "Naked Lunch Excerpts (You Got Any Eggs for Fats?)/Dinner Conversation (The Snakes)" (music by Frank Denning)
 "Ah Pook the Destroyer/Brion Gysin's All-Purpose Bedtime Story" (featuring John Cale)
 "After-Diner Conversation (An Atrocious Conceit)/Where He Was Going" (music by Frank Denning)
 "Kill the Badger!" (music by Buryl Reed)
 "A New Standard by Which to Measure Infamy" (featuring Donald Fagen)
 "The Sermon on the Mount 1 (WSB Reads The Good Book)" (music by Lenny Pickett)
 "No More Stalins, No More Hitlers" (featuring John Cale)
 "The Sermon on the Mount 2" (music by Lenny Pickett)
 "Scandal at the Jungle Hiltons" (featuring Allen Ginsberg)
 "The Sermon on the Mount 3" (music by Lenny Pickett)
 "Love Your Enemies" (featuring John Cale)
 "Dr. Benway's House" (featuring Sonic Youth)
 "Apocalypse" (music by Bill Giant, Eugene Cines, Frank Denning, Ray Ellis)
 "The Lord's Prayer" (featuring Chris Stein & Sonic Youth)
 "Ich bin von Kopf bis Fuß auf Liebe eingestellt (Falling in Love Again)" (Friedrich Hollander)

Personnel

 William S. Burroughs - Primary Artist, Vocals, Voices
 Maxine Neuman - Cello
 Lenny Pickett - Clarinet, Track Performer, Woodwind, arranger
 Tom Varner - French Horn
 NBC Symphony Orchestra - Performing Ensemble
 Cheryl Hardwick - Organ, Piano, Track Performer
 Bobby Previte - Percussion
 Donald Fagen - Track Performer
 Sonic Youth - Track Performer
 Chris Stein - Track Performer
 Dennis Martin - Vocals
 Leslie Miller - Vocals
 Frank Simms - Vocals, Technical Credits
 Arlene Martel - Vocals
 Allen Ginsberg - Contributor
 Kim Gordon - Contributor
 Thurston Moore - Contributor
 Lee Ranaldo - Contributor
 Adrian Boot - Cover Photo
 Joe Ferla - Engineer
 Chris Laidlaw - Engineer
 Hal Willner - Engineer, Liner Notes, Producer
 Nelson Lyon - Producer
 Jack Adelman - Mastering
Executive producer: Les Michaels
Associate producer: James Grauerholz

External links 
 
 

1990 albums
William S. Burroughs albums
Albums produced by Hal Willner
Island Records albums